Teryn Ashley and Abigail Spears were the defending champions, but Spears decided to compete in Gold Coast at the same week. Ashley teamed up with Shenay Perry and lost in first round to Iveta Benešová and Renata Voráčová.

Mervana Jugić-Salkić and Jelena Kostanić won the title by defeating Virginia Ruano Pascual and Paola Suárez 7–6(8–6), 3–6, 6–1 in the final.

Seeds

Draw

Draw

Qualifying

Seeds

Qualifiers
  Shinobu Asagoe /  Yuka Yoshida

Qualifying draw

References
 Official results archive (ITF)
 Official results archive (WTA)

WTA Auckland Open